The Manassas campaign was a series of military engagements in the Eastern Theater of the American Civil War.

Background

Military and political situation

The Confederate forces in northern Virginia were organized into two field armies. Brigadier General P. G. T. Beauregard was appointed commander of the Confederate Army of the Potomac in northeastern Virginia to defend the rail center of Manassas Junction; while General Joseph E. Johnston commanded the Army of the Shenandoah near Harpers Ferry in the Shenandoah Valley. The Manassas Gap Railroad connected the two forces and allowed for the quick transfer of reinforcements between the two armies. During the months of June and July, Beauregard sent Confederate President Jefferson Davis several proposals for offensive operations into Maryland, involving the various Confederate armies in Virginia, but Davis rejected them for being impractical, saying the Confederates lacked the proper resources to support any of his offensive plans.

Following the Union occupation of Alexandria, Virginia, the Union forces in Virginia were organized into the Department of Northeastern Virginia, commanded by Brigadier General Irvin McDowell, who was ordered to advance on the Confederate national capital of Richmond, Virginia. Meanwhile, Robert Patterson was assigned to command the Department of Pennsylvania and was ordered to tie down Johnston's forces in the northern Shenandoah Valley, preventing him from reinforcing Beauregard. Patterson advanced into the Valley in early June, forcing the evacuation of Harpers Ferry on June 17. Johnston retreated back to the town of Winchester, where he was reinforced by home guard units and local militia, which caused Patterson to think he was outnumbered. During this time, Patterson was having difficulty receiving supplies from Pennsylvania; also his regiments of three–month volunteers were nearing the end of their enlistments and were refusing to stay any longer. The Union general–in–chief, Brevet Lieutenant General Winfield Scott, was pressing him to send his Regular Army units to McDowell's army.

During the months of June and early July, the armies of McDowell and Beauregard engaged in several skirmishes in northeastern Virginia while the Union government and military leadership debated the proper course of action for McDowell to take. Scott favored concentrating a Union army to capture the Mississippi River valley, while McDowell viewed his army as too inexperienced to attack Beauregard yet. Due to Pressure from U.S. President Abraham Lincoln and the Union press, McDowell started his campaign against Manassas Junction on July 17. Johnston received orders the next day to start transferring his army to Manassas Junction to reinforce Beauregard; using the Manassas Gap Railroad, his army arrived on July 20 and 21. The Manassas Campaign would end in a Confederate Victory due to this inexperience. It was this early campaign that would show the North that the Confederacy was not going to be a quick rebellion.

Opposing forces

Union

Confederate

Battles

Hoke's Run

Following the Confederate abandonment of Harpers Ferry on June 15, Johnston sent Colonel Thomas J. Jackson's brigade to establish a camp near the town of Martinsburg, so to both serve as a warning of a Union advance and to delay Patterson's force. On July 2, Patterson crossed the Potomac and advanced on Jackson's position. Outnumbered and outflanked, Jackson fell back slowly, giving time for his supply train to escape before retreating to rejoin Johnston's main army.

Blackburn's Ford

McDowell's army arrived at Centreville during the morning of July 18, led by Brigadier General David Tyler's division. Under orders to reconnoiter the Confederate defenses near Blackburn's Ford but not to bring on an engagement, Tyler launched an attack with Colonel Israel B. Richardson's brigade but was repulsed by the brigades of James Longstreet and Jubal Early.The battle ended with an artillery duel which lasted until dark, at which time Tyler withdrew back to Centreville.

First Bull Run (Manassas)

Following Tyler's defeat, McDowell decided to attempt an attack on the Confederate left flank. Starting about dawn on the 21, one Union division started a diversionary attack on the Stone Bridge on the Confederate left and two other divisions demonstrated against the Confederate center and right, while two other divisions marched around the Confederate left flank to launch an attack on the Confederate rear. The Union flanking column was spotted and Confederate reinforcements were rushed to Matthew's Hill but were driven back to Henry House Hill. A new Confederate defensive line, using brigades from Johnston's army, was formed along the hill, where they held against repeated Union attacks during the afternoon. A Confederate attack on the Union left flank in the late afternoon forced McDowell to retreat back to the defenses of Washington, D.C.

Aftermath
Davis arrived on the Manassas battlefield soon after the battle ended. Although he attempted to organize a pursuit of the Union army, he was convinced that the Confederate armies were too disorganized to mount an effective pursuit. The dispute between Beauregard and Davis over who was responsible for the failed pursuit resulted in Beauregard's transfer to the Western Theater. In October, Johnston's and Beauregard's commands were merged into the Department of Northern Virginia, with the combined army retaining the name "Army of the Potomac".

Following First Bull Run, McDowell retreated to Centreville and set up a rearguard. At a council of war held after sunset, a majority of officers urged a retreat, which started that night. In August, the Department of Northeastern Virginia was merged with other departments in Maryland to form the Department of the Potomac, commanded by George C. McClellan. McDowell was demoted to commanding a division. Patterson was blamed for allowing Johnston to reinforce Beauregard and was also relieved of command.

See also

 Troop engagements of the American Civil War, 1861
 List of costliest American Civil War land battles
 Origins of the American Civil War
 Battle of Fort Sumter
 Bull Run Mountains
 Commemoration of the American Civil War on postage stamps

Notes

References
 Davis, William C. Battle at Bull Run: A History of the First Major Campaign of the Civil War. Garden City, New York: Doubleday & Company, Inc., 1977.
 Detzel, David. Dooneybrook: The Battle of Bull Run, 1861. New York: Harcourt, Inc., 2004. .
 Gimbel, Gary. "The End of Innocence: The Battle of Falling Waters", in Blue & Gray, Volume XXII, number 4 (Fall 2005).
 Gottfried, Bradley G. The Maps of First Bull Run: An Atlas of the First Bull Run (Manassas) Campaign, including the Battle of Ball's Bluff, June – October 1861. New York: Savas Beatie, 2009. .
 Robertson, William G. "First Manassas, Virginia (VA005), Prince William County, July 21, 1861", in The Civil War Battlefield Guide, 2nd edition, edited by Francis H. Kennedy. New York: Houghton Mifflin Company, 1998. .

Memoirs and primary sources
 Longstreet, James. From Manassas to Appomattox: Memoirs of the Civil War in America. New York: Da Capo Press, 1992. . First published in 1896 by J. B. Lippincott and Co.
 U.S. War Department, The War of the Rebellion: a Compilation of the Official Records of the Union and Confederate Armies. Washington, DC: U.S. Government Printing Office, 1880–1901

External links
 Battle of Bull Run: Battle maps, photos, history articles, and battlefield news (Civil War Trust)
 "Map of the Battles of Bull Run, 1861", prepared by Army engineer, National Archives and Record Administration, at World Digital Library
 Manassas National Battlefield Park website
 First Battle of Manassas: An End to Innocence, a National Park Service Teaching with Historic Places (TwHP) lesson plan
 Harper's Weekly 1861 Report on the Battle of Bull Run
 Civil War Home website on First Bull Run
 Animated history of the First Battle of Bull Run
 FirstBullRun.co.uk
 
 First Manassas Campaign with Official Records and Reports
 Map of the Battles of Bull Run Near Manassas. Solomon Bamberger. Zoomable high-resolution map.
 Newspaper coverage of the First Battle of Bull Run
 
 

 
Bull Run I
Bull Run I
Prince William County in the American Civil War
Fairfax County in the American Civil War
Bull Run I
United States Marine Corps in the 18th and 19th centuries
1861 in the American Civil War
1861 in Virginia